Althorne railway station is on the Crouch Valley Line in the East of England, serving the village of Althorne, Essex. The station is  managed by Greater Anglia who operate all services. The Engineer's Line Reference for line is WIS; the station's three-letter station code is ALN. The single platform, north of the running line, has an operational length for eight-coach trains.

The line and station were opened on 1 June 1889 for goods and on 1 October 1889 for passenger services by the Great Eastern Railway. The facilities included a single platform with station buildings, a goods yard, and a 30-lever signal box south of the station. Two miles east of Althorne, Creeksea sidings (facing points in the "down" direction) received traffic to and from the Creeksea ferry from 1889 to 1947.

Ownership passed to the London and North Eastern Railway following the Grouping of 1923, and then to the Eastern Region of British Railways upon nationalisation in 1948. When sectorisation was introduced, Althorne was served by Network SouthEast until the privatisation of British Railways. The goods yard closed on 19 December 1960, and the signal box on 21 January 1967. The level crossing to the east of the station was normally closed to road vehicles but was later converted to an automatic open crossing with lights. Electrification of the Wickford to Southminster line using 25 kV overhead line electrification (OLE) was completed on 12 May 1986.

Services
On Sundays, the service is reduced is to hourly.

References

External links

 Station on navigable O.S. map
History of the Crouch Valley Line
Local information about Crouch Valley Line

Railway stations in Essex
DfT Category F2 stations
Former Great Eastern Railway stations
Railway stations in Great Britain opened in 1889
Greater Anglia franchise railway stations
William Neville Ashbee railway stations